Kapuiviit (Inuktitut syllabics: ᑲᐳᐃᕖᑦ) formerly Jens Munk Island, for Dano-Norwegian explorer Jens Munk, is one of the Canadian arctic islands in the Qikiqtaaluk Region, Nunavut, Canada.

The island presently has no permanent resident population (since displacements driven by colonialism took place in the 1950s and 1960s) but it remains an important outpost camp in the Igloolik Island area. Historically, however, it was the location of Kapuivik, a hunting camp which is now an important archaeological site for the research of pre-Inuit peoples including the Dorset (Tuniit), Pre-Dorset and Paleo-Inuit.

Kapuivik was also the birthplace of noted film director Zacharias Kunuk.

References

Islands of Foxe Basin
Uninhabited islands of Qikiqtaaluk Region